Ryan Gingeras is a professor at the Naval Postgraduate School in California and a historian of the late Ottoman Empire.

He is the author of five books, including Eternal Dawn: Turkey in the Age of Ataturk and Sorrowful Shores: Violence, Ethnicity, and the End of the Ottoman Empire. He has published on a wide variety of topics related to history and politics in such publications as Foreign Affairs, New York Times, International Journal of Middle East Studies, Middle East Journal, Iranian Studies, Past & Present, and War on the Rocks.

Gingeras stated that he wanted to write his dissertation about Kars during World War I, or how Nakhichevan became part of Azerbaijan, but was warned that writing about controversial topics such as Kurds and Armenians would be akin to "professional suicide".

Works

References

Naval Postgraduate School faculty
Scholars of Ottoman history
Historians of Turkey
21st-century American historians
American male non-fiction writers
Year of birth missing (living people)
Living people
21st-century American male writers